Glipostenoda sasajii is a species of beetle in the genus Glipostenoda. It was described in 2001.

References

sasajii
Beetles described in 2001